Argzim Redžović (born 26 February 1992 in Bar, Montenegro) is a Montenegrin footballer who plays for Terengganu in Malaysia Super League as a defender. His cousin Mehmet Durakovic also previously played for the Malaysian League.

Club career

Early Career
He had started his professional football career with Montenegro club, FK Mogren in 2011. He also had a spell with Austrian club, Kapfenberger SV and played in the German Oberliga for Malchower SV. After that, he joined Petrovac in 2015–16 Montenegrin First League season.

Lanexang United
Departing FK Istra in June 2016 to play his trade abroad with Lanexang United of the Lao Premier League, Redžović was seen as an important player for the club, earning the man-of-the-match award in a 3–3 draw with Yadanarbon in the 2016 Mekong Club Championship and receiving an honorarium as well.

At the 2016 Mekong Club Championship, the Montenegrin defender suffered a fractured foot in the second half of the semi-final facing Boeung Ket Angkor.

Petrovac
In 2017, he returned back to his former club, Petrovac for short period of time.

PDRM
After his contract ended with Petrovac, he joined Malaysian club, PDRM to played in 2018 Malaysia Premier League season.

Terengganu
He joined Malaysian club, Terengganu FC in 2020 Malaysia Super League season.

References

External links 
 

1992 births
Living people
People from Bar, Montenegro
Association football defenders
Montenegrin footballers
FK Mogren players
FK Igalo 1929 players
Kapfenberger SV players
OFK Petrovac players
FK Iskra Danilovgrad players
Lanexang United F.C. players
PDRM FA players
Terengganu FC players
Montenegrin First League players
2. Liga (Austria) players
Austrian Regionalliga players
Oberliga (football) players
Malaysia Premier League players
Malaysia Super League players
Montenegrin expatriate footballers
Montenegrin Muslims
Montenegrin people of Albanian descent
Expatriate footballers in Austria
Montenegrin expatriate sportspeople in Austria
Expatriate footballers in Germany
Montenegrin expatriate sportspeople in Germany
Expatriate footballers in Laos
Expatriate footballers in Malaysia
Montenegrin expatriate sportspeople in Malaysia
Albanians in Montenegro